Orthonama quadrisecta is a species of moth of the family Geometridae first described by Claude Herbulot in 1954. It is found on Madagascar, Réunion, Mauritius and the Comoros.

Its wingspan is around 18–21 mm.

The larvae feed on Polygonaceae (Rumex crispus)

References

Herbulot, C. (1954). "Nouveaux Geometridae malgaches". Mémoires de l'Institut scientifique de Madagascar (E)5: 81–123. pls. 4–5.

External links
 Picture of Orthonama quadrisecta on Flickr

Larentiinae
Moths described in 1954
Moths of Madagascar
Moths of the Comoros
Moths of Mauritius
Moths of Réunion